André Sana (20 December 1920 – 8 May 2013) was an Iraqi hierarch of the Chaldean Catholic Church.

Born in Araden, Iraq, he was ordained a priest on 15 May 1945. He was elected Bishop of the Catholic Diocese of Aqra (Chaldean Rite) on 20 June 1957, and was consecrated bishop on 6 October 1957. He was elected bishop of the Catholic Diocese of Kirkuk (Chaldean Rite)  on 14 December 1977 until his retirement on 27 September 2003.

1920 births
2013 deaths
20th-century Eastern Catholic bishops
21st-century Eastern Catholic archbishops
Iraqi Eastern Catholics
Iraqi archbishops
Chaldean Catholics
Chaldean archbishops
Place of death missing
People from Dohuk Province